Operation Custom Tailor was an American cruiser and destroyer strike force that conducted a raid on Haiphong, North Vietnam, in 10 May 1972. It was a history-making strike that involved the most formidable cruiser/destroyer fleet in the Western Pacific since World War II. During the strike, military targets within four miles of Haiphong were hit and enemy opposition was heavy.

Operation

During the raid, USS Hanson entered Haiphong Harbor to suppress North Vietnamese shore batteries while enabling other United States Navy forces to mine the Haiphong Harbor entrance. This made USS Hanson the last American warship to enter Haiphong Harbor during the Vietnam War and the last one out.

References

Conflicts in 1972
Campaigns of the Vietnam War
1972 in Vietnam
Battles and operations of the Vietnam War in 1972
Naval battles of the Vietnam War involving the United States
Naval battles of the Vietnam War
May 1972 events in Asia
History of Haiphong